Kuhsaran District is a district (bakhsh) in Ravar County, Kerman Province, Iran. At the 2006 census, its population was 7,399, in 1,958 families.  The district has one city: Hojedk. The district has two rural districts (dehestan): Heruz Rural District and Horjand Rural District.

References 

Ravar County
Districts of Kerman Province